Dritan Stafsula (born 16 July 1981 in Tirana) is an Albanian-born Finnish retired footballer, who finished his career at Finnish team Haukiputaan Pallo. He played the majority of his career however for AC Oulu.

Futsal
Stafsula also played futsal for Oulun side FC Tervarit.

Notes

1981 births
Living people
Footballers from Tirana
Albanian footballers
Finnish people of Albanian descent
Association football wingers
Finnish footballers
Finnish men's futsal players
AC Oulu players
AC Allianssi players
Tampere United players
FK Bodø/Glimt players
FC Zhenis Astana players
FC DAC 1904 Dunajská Streda players
Bodens BK players
Haukiputaan Pallo players
Veikkausliiga players
Norwegian First Division players
Slovak Super Liga players
Finnish expatriate footballers
Expatriate footballers in Norway
Expatriate footballers in Kazakhstan
Expatriate footballers in Slovakia
Expatriate footballers in Sweden
Finnish expatriate sportspeople in Norway
Finnish expatriate sportspeople in Kazakhstan
Finnish expatriate sportspeople in Slovakia
Finnish expatriate sportspeople in Sweden